Lionel Charles Knights (15 May 1906 – 8 March 1997) was an English literary critic, an authority on Shakespeare and his period. His essay How many children had Lady Macbeth? (1933) is a classic of modern criticism. He became King Edward VII Professor of English Literature at the University of Cambridge in 1965.

Early life
He was born in Grantham and initially attended The King's School in the town, followed by Hutchesons' Grammar School, Glasgow and Cambridgeshire High School for Boys. He was educated at Selwyn College, Cambridge, where he read History and English, graduating with a first-class degree in 1928. In his final undergraduate year he won the Charles Oldham Shakespeare prize, shared with Humphrey Jennings. He was elected to a research scholarship at Christ's College, Cambridge in 1930, where he worked on his doctoral thesis.

Literary career
He was a co-editor of Scrutiny, the literary journal of F. R. Leavis's school, from May 15, 1932 to 1953 when it ceased publication.

He was an English lecturer at the University of Manchester in 1933, then Professor of English Literature at the University of Sheffield in 1947 and the Winterstoke Professor of English at University of Bristol in 1953. From 1965-73, he was King Edward VII Professor of English Literature at the University of Cambridge.

Personal life
He married Elizabeth Barnes in 1936. They had a son, Benjamin, and a daughter, Frances. Knights died in Durham in 1997.

Works

How Many Children Had Lady Macbeth. An Essay in the Theory and Practice of Shakespeare Criticism (1933) 
Drama & Society in the Age of Jonson (1937)
Explorations: Essays in Criticism Mainly On the Literature of the Seventeenth Century (1946)
Poetry, Politics and the English Tradition (1954)
Some Shakespearean Themes (1959)
An Approach to 'Hamlet' (1960)
Shakespeare: The Histories (1962)
Further Explorations (1965)
Public Voices: Literature and Politics With Special Reference to the Seventeenth Century (1971)
Coleridge's Variety: Bicentennial Studies (1974), editor with John Beer
Explorations 3: Essays in Criticism (1976)
Selected Essays in Criticism (1981)
Regulated Hatred and Other Essays on Jane Austen, with D. W. Harding and Monica Lawlor

References

English literary critics
Academics of the University of Sheffield
Alumni of Selwyn College, Cambridge
Alumni of Christ's College, Cambridge
People from Grantham
1906 births
1997 deaths
Academics of the University of Cambridge
Shakespearean scholars
Academics of the Victoria University of Manchester
Academics of the University of Bristol
Fellows of Queens' College, Cambridge
20th-century poets
King Edward VII Professors of English Literature